Tord Folkeson Palander (6 October 1902 – 1972) was a Swedish economist. His Ph.D. thesis, Beiträge zur Standortstheorie (Contributions to Location Theory), completed in 1935 at the Stockholm University College, laid foundations to regional science.

Palander first studied chemical engineering at the Royal Institute of Technology, and graduated in 1926. He then started to study economics at the Stockholm University College. In 1941, Palander became a professor at the Gothenburg School of Business, Economics and Law, and in 1948 at the University of Uppsala.

References

External links
 Beiträge zur Standortstheorie, Palander's Ph.D. thesis 

1902 births
1972 deaths
Academic staff of the University of Gothenburg
Academic staff of Uppsala University
Stockholm University alumni
KTH Royal Institute of Technology alumni
20th-century  Swedish economists
Regional economists
Members of the Royal Society of Sciences in Uppsala